Osea Island ("Osyth's island"), formerly also Osey, is an inhabited island in the estuary of the River Blackwater, Essex, East England. The population of the Island is included in the civil parish of Heybridge.

Northey Island lies about a mile to the west and Mersea Island is about five miles to the north east. The entire island is owned by music producer Nigel Frieda.

Notable residents
Before 2004, the island had a small community of tenants such as the painter Luke Elwes, photographer Hélène Binet, and philosopher David Papineau. It was revealed in 2019 that Bajan singer Rihanna rented the island to record her upcoming album.

History
The name "Osea" means "Osyth's Island" and thus the name is tautological.

Military use

In 1913 the British Deperdussin Aeroplane Company tested a newly developed seaplane at Osea. It was a single-engined seaplane with two large floats. It was piloted by John Cyril Porte, the managing director of the company, and took off from the deep water channel to the south of the island. It had a successful ten-minute flight.

Osea Island was the site of a Coastal Motor Torpedo Boat base during the First World War and 2,000 sailors were billeted there, mainly in temporary huts which were removed after the war. Augustus Agar was awarded the Victoria Cross while stationed on the island and detailed his experiences in his book Baltic Episode.

In the Second World War, the island was occupied by the British Army.

Filming
The 1979 Children's Film Foundation film Black Island, produced by Kingsgate Films and directed by Ben Bolt, was shot on and around the island. The film is about two young castaways who are captured by escaped convicts on the island and their subsequent escape attempts.

Both the 1989 television adaptation of Susan Hill's novel The Woman in Black and the 2012 film adaptation of the same used the island's causeway as the location for the fictional Nine Lives Causeway.

The island was used for auditions on the ITV1 show Superstar, filmed in early 2012, in which it was known as Superstar Island. It was the second episode and included eliminations. Andrew Lloyd Webber was casting for a new lead role, in his production of Jesus Christ Superstar. Melanie C, Dawn French and Jason Donovan were also on the panel.

The island is the setting for the television drama miniseries The Third Day.

Treatment
Osea Island holds a place in the history of drug and alcohol treatment in Britain. It was formerly owned by a member of the Charrington brewing family, Frederick Nicholas Charrington, who also founded the Tower Hamlets Mission, which continues to house a drug and alcohol treatment centre, Charis. Charrington established a retreat for wealthy alcoholics on Osea Island, among whom it is rumoured that Walter Sickert was included.

From 2005 to 2010, it was a rehabilitation centre specialising in the treatment of addiction problems and mental health called the Causeway Retreat, managed by former nurse Brendan Quinn. In 2008, Amy Winehouse attended the rehab clinic on the island. The Causeway Retreat was refused registration on 30 September 2010 by the Care Quality Commission, and Brendan Quinn was suspended as a nurse by the Nursing and Midwifery Council on 20 September 2010. On 19 November 2010 Brendan Quinn's Twenty 7 Management, which had run the Causeway Retreat, pleaded guilty at Chelmsford Magistrates' Court, and was fined £8,000 plus £30,000 costs for running an unlicensed hospital. District Judge David Cooper said the firm's standards "would really shame a third world country".

Music
The island is used by musicians as a private retreat to record albums. It has its own fully equipped recording studio as well as ample accommodation.

References

External links
 Pillbox photos 
 
 Video of the Island

Islands of Essex
Tidal islands of England